Cory Nathanial Gearrin (born April 14, 1986) is an American former professional baseball pitcher. He played in Major League Baseball (MLB) for the Atlanta Braves, San Francisco Giants, Texas Rangers, Oakland Athletics, Seattle Mariners, New York Yankees, and Minnesota Twins.

Career

Amateur
Prior to playing professionally, Gearrin attended Rhea County High School, Young Harris College, and Mercer University. In 2006, he played collegiate summer baseball with the Cotuit Kettleers of the Cape Cod Baseball League and was named a league all-star. Gearrin was listed as a top 30 prospect in the Cape Cod League in 2006. That summer, he boasted a 1.67 ERA, striking out 41 batters in 27 innings while going 2-1 and having 8 saves. In that same summer, his pitches were clocking between 88 and 89 miles per hour. In 2007, Gearrin's junior season at Mercer, he went 4–3 with a 2.44 ERA in 26 relief appearances. He had 13 saves and 65 strikeouts in 44 innings of work, allowing only 15 hits. Gearrin was then drafted by the Braves in the fourth round of the 2007 amateur draft.

Minor leagues

He began his professional career in 2007, going 1–1 with a 4.44 ERA in 18 relief appearances, striking out 37 batters in 26 innings of work for the Danville Braves. The following season, he went 6–3 with a 4.11 ERA in 36 relief appearances for the Rome Braves and Myrtle Beach Pelicans, striking out 72 batters in 46 innings pitched. In 2009, Gearrin played for the Pelicans and Mississippi Braves, going a combined 1–4 with a 2.30, saving 19 games. He pitched for the Gwinnett Braves in 2010, going 3–5 with a 3.36 ERA in 52 relief appearances.

Major League Overview
Over the course of his major league career as of 2020, he has put up 302 pitched innings of work with a 3.64 earned run average, a 1.31 WHIP, 3.84 base on balls in nine innings, and 8.40 strikeouts in nine innings.

Atlanta Braves
On April 22, 2011, Gearrin was called up to Atlanta's major league team from AAA Gwinnett, a move that General Manager, Frank Wren, described as a "necessity." In the bottom of the ninth of a tied game against San Diego on April 25, 2011, Gearrin made his major league debut by retiring the side in order and getting a strikeout. Returning to the mound for the bottom of the tenth, Gearrin again retired the Padres in order while registering another strikeout. On May 1, 2011, Gearrin recorded his first blown save after giving up the tying run in the 7th inning to the St. Louis Cardinals, a game the Braves later came back to win. While he was with  Atlanta in 2011, he had a 1–1 record with an ERA of 7.85 in 18 games with zero saves in 18.1 innings of work, while giving up 17 hits, 16 earned runs and no home runs.

After being recalled to the Braves from Gwinnett once again on April 24, 2012, when Jair Jurrjens was sent down, Gearrin was sent back down 5 days later when Tim Hudson was activated from the DL having not appeared with the Braves.

During the 2013 season, Gearrin became a key part of the Braves bullpen due to many injuries to regular relief pitchers. Despite a good start to the season (a 1.46 ERA in April and a 2.13 ERA in May), Gearrin's ERA increased significantly in June (10.80 in six appearances). After allowing two earned runs during a relief appearance on July 3, Gearrin was optioned to Gwinnett for the first time in 2013 on July 5. In 2014, 
Gearrin attended Spring Training with the Braves. He was likely to earn one of the open roster spots in the bullpen, but Gearrin left his last outing with discomfort in his right elbow. It was later revealed that Gearrin would need Tommy John Surgery and miss the 2014 season. He was released by the Braves on November 10, 2014.

San Francisco Giants
Gearrin signed a minor league deal to join the San Francisco Giants in December 2014.  He was called up to the Giants in September 2015 and appeared in seven games, pitching 3 innings.  In 2016, Gearrin was named to the opening day Major League roster for the Giants. In 56 games, he was 3–2 with a 4.28 ERA in  innings. He also had 3 saves.

Gearrin and the Giants avoided salary arbitration on December 3, 2016, by agreeing to a one-year, $1.05 million contract for the 2017 season.

He was the only MLB pitcher to give up two bases-loaded triples in 2017. He enjoyed the best season of his career in 2017, posting an ERA of 1.99 in 68 games. In 2018, he was 1–1 in 30 innings for the Giants.

Texas Rangers
On July 8, 2018, Gearrin was traded to the Texas Rangers along with Austin Jackson and minor league pitcher Jason Bahr in exchange for a player to be named later or cash considerations.

Oakland Athletics
On August 31, 2018, Gearrin was traded to the Oakland Athletics in exchange for minor league pitchers Abdiel Mendoza and Teodoro Ortega. Gearrin pitched in only 6 games in September.

Seattle Mariners
On January 10, 2019, Gearrin signed a one-year contract with the Seattle Mariners.

New York Yankees
On August 23, 2019, Gearrin was claimed off waivers by the New York Yankees. Gearrin became a free agent after the season.

Minnesota Twins
On February 17, 2020, Gearrin signed a minor league deal with the Minnesota Twins that included an invite to Spring Training. On August 9, 2020, the Twins selected Gearrin to the active roster. Gearrin elected free agency on October 14, 2020.

Personal
Gearrin and his wife, Maddi, married on May 18, 2017, an off-day for the Giants.

Gearrin grew up an Atlanta Braves fan.

References

External links

1986 births
Living people
Sportspeople from Chattanooga, Tennessee
Baseball players from Tennessee
Major League Baseball pitchers
Atlanta Braves players
San Francisco Giants players
Texas Rangers players
Oakland Athletics players
Seattle Mariners players
New York Yankees players
Minnesota Twins players
Young Harris Mountain Lions baseball players
Mercer Bears baseball players
Cotuit Kettleers players
Danville Braves players
Myrtle Beach Pelicans players
Rome Braves players
Mississippi Braves players
Gwinnett Braves players
Sacramento River Cats players